Göppingen is an electoral constituency (German: Wahlkreis) represented in the Bundestag. It elects one member via first-past-the-post voting. Under the current constituency numbering system, it is designated as constituency 263. It is located in eastern Baden-Württemberg, comprising the Göppingen district.

Göppingen was created for the inaugural 1949 federal election. Since 2013, it has been represented by Hermann Färber of the Christian Democratic Union (CDU).

Geography
Göppingen is located in eastern Baden-Württemberg. As of the 2021 federal election, it is coterminous with the Göppingen district.

History
Göppingen was created in 1949. In the 1949 election, it was Württemberg-Baden Landesbezirk Württemberg constituency 7 in the numbering system. In the 1953 through 1961 elections, it was number 169. In the 1965 through 1976 elections, it was number 172. In the 1980 through 1998 elections, it was number 167. In the 2002 and 2005 elections, it was number 264. Since the 2009 election, it has been number 263.

Originally, the constituency comprised the Göppingen district and the municipalities of Bissingen an der Teck, Dettingen unter Teck, Holzmaden, Kirchheim unter Teck, Lenningen, Neidlingen, Notzingen, Ohmden, Owen, Weilheim an der Teck, and Wolfschlugen from the Nürtingen district. It acquired its current borders in the 1965 election.

Members
The constituency has been held continuously by the Christian Democratic Union (CDU) since its creation. It was first represented by Georg Baur from 1949 to 1953, followed by Hermann Finckh from 1953 to 1965. Manfred Wörner was representative from 1965 to 1990, a total of seven consecutive terms. Claus Jäger served one term from 1990 to 1994, followed by Klaus Riegert from 1994 to 2013. Hermann Färber was elected in 2013, and re-elected in 2017 and 2021.

Election results

2021

2017

2013

2009

References

Federal electoral districts in Baden-Württemberg
1949 establishments in West Germany
Constituencies established in 1949
Göppingen (district)